Geophis anocularis, also known as the Sierra Mije earth snake, is a snake of the colubrid family. It is endemic to Mexico.

References

Colubrids
Snakes of North America
Endemic reptiles of Mexico
Taxa named by Emmett Reid Dunn
Reptiles described in 1920